Wendy Windham (born January 13, 1967) is an American actress, working primarily in Italy.

Biography
The niece of comedian / actor Stan Laurel, 
Wendy moved to Italy to work in television in 1988, taking part in Il gioco dei nove ("The game of nine") and appearing on Maurizio Costanzo's talk-show.
In 1990, she appeared on TG delle vacanze ("News of holidays") and then on programs such as Casa dolce casa ("Home Sweet Home", 1992), i Cervelloni ("Brains", 1994 and 1995) and Faccia tosta (1997).

In 2001 Windham retired from Italian television and retired to private life in Miami, Florida.

Personal life 
Windham married the manufacturer Jeff Safchik.

Filmography

Film 
 L'odissea (1991)
 Omicidio a luci blu (1991)
 Gratta e vinci (1996)

Television 
 Raimondo... e le altre – Rai1 1991
 Il TG delle vacanze – Canale 5 1991–1992
 Sabato al circo – Canale 5 1991–1992
Casa dolce casa – Canale 5 1992–1994
 Dido...menica – Italia 1 – 1992–1993
 Ma mi faccia il piacere... – Italia 1 – 1993
 'I cervelloni – Rai1 – 1994/1998
 Il Gioco delle Coppie Beach – Rete 4 – 1994
 I Fatti Vostri – Piazza Italia di sera – Rai2 – 1995–1996
 Miss Italia nel Mondo Rai1 – 1996
 Il Gatto e la Volpe – Canale 5 – 1997
 Faccia Tosta – Rai1 – 1997
 Mezzanotte: Angeli in piazza'' – Rai1/Rai2 – 1998–1999

References

External links
 

1967 births
Living people
Actresses from Los Angeles
Actresses from Miami
21st-century American women